Jiao Yunlong (born 19 May 1988) is a Chinese fencer. He competed in the men's épée event at the 2016 Summer Olympics.

References

External links
 

1988 births
Living people
Chinese male épée fencers
Olympic fencers of China
Fencers at the 2016 Summer Olympics
Place of birth missing (living people)
Fencers at the 2014 Asian Games
Asian Games competitors for China
21st-century Chinese people